The men's discus throw throwing event at the 1960 Summer Olympics took place on September 6 & September 7. Thirty-five athletes from 22 nations competed. The maximum number of athletes per nation had been set at 3 since the 1930 Olympic Congress. The event was won by Al Oerter of the United States, the nation's third consecutive and 10th overall victory in the men's discus throw. It was Oerter's second gold medal in the event; he would go on to win four. Oerter was the sixth man to win two medals in the event, and the third to win two gold medals. The United States earned its second consecutive and third overall medal sweep in the event, as Rink Babka took silver and Dick Cochran bronze.

Background

This was the 14th appearance of the event, which is one of 12 athletics events to have been held at every Summer Olympics. Returning finalists from the 1956 Games were gold medalist Al Oerter of the United States, sixth-place finisher (and 1948 gold medalist and 1952 silver medalist) Adolfo Consolini of Italy, seventh-place finisher Ferenc Klics of Hungary, twelfth-place finisher Kim Bukhantsov of the Soviet Union, thirteenth-place finisher Fanie du Plessis of South Africa, fourteenth-place finisher Erik Uddebom of Sweden, and fifteenth-place finisher Mesulame Rakuro of Fiji. Oerter and Rink Babka were the favorites, with Oerter a slight edge. Oerter was AAU champion in 1957, 1969, and 1960; Babka beat Oerter in the U.S. Olympic trials and set the world record a month before the Games.

Bulgaria, Iraq, and New Zealand each made their debut in the men's discus throw; Germany competed as the "United Team of Germany" for the first time. The United States made its 14th appearance, having competed in every edition of the Olympic men's discus throw to date.

Competition format

The competition used the two-round format introduced in 1936, with the qualifying round completely separate from the divided final. In qualifying, each athlete received three attempts; those recording a mark of at least 52.00 metres advanced to the final (a steep increase from 1956's 47.00 metres, which had allowed 16 men to advance, though not nearly steep enough: 22 men beat the qualifying mark in 1960). If fewer than 12 athletes achieved that distance, the top 12 would advance. The results of the qualifying round were then ignored. Finalists received three throws each, with the top six competitors receiving an additional three attempts. The best distance among those six throws counted.

Records

Prior to the competition, the existing world and Olympic records were as follows.

Al Oerter had a very short throw in the first set of qualifying round throws, but in the second set he qualified for the final with a launch that broke his own Olympic record by over 2 metres—landing at 58.43 metres. His teammates Rink Babka (three times) and Dick Cochran (once) both exceeded the old record in the final, but only Oerter was able to beat his new record; Oerter threw 59.18 metres in the fifth throw of the final. All six of Oerter's final throws were longer than the old record.

Schedule

All times are Central European Time (UTC+1)

Results

All throwers reaching 52.00 metres advanced to the finals. All distances are listen in metres.

Qualifying

Final

References

M
Discus throw at the Olympics
Men's events at the 1960 Summer Olympics